The Communist Party of Kampuchea (CPK), also known as the Khmer Communist Party, was a communist party in Cambodia. Its leader was Pol Pot and its members were generally known as the Khmer Rouge (Red Khmer). Originally founded in 1951, the party was split into pro-Chinese and pro-Soviet factions as a result of the Sino–Soviet split with the former being the Pol Pot faction, and the latter adopting a more revisionist approach to Marxism. As such, it claimed that 30 September 1960 was its founding date, then it was named the Workers' Party of Kampuchea before it was renamed the Communist Party in 1966.

The party operated underground during most of its existence and it took control of the country in April 1975 and established the state which was known as Democratic Kampuchea. The party lost power in 1979 with the establishment of the People's Republic of Kampuchea following the intervention of Vietnamese military forces. The party was officially dissolved in 1981, with the Party of Democratic Kampuchea claiming its legacy.

History

Foundation of the party and first divisions 
The party was founded in 1951, when the Indochinese Communist Party (ICP) was divided into separate Cambodian, Lao and Vietnamese communist parties. The decision to form a separate Cambodian communist party had been taken at the ICP congress in February the same year. Different sources claim different dates for the exact founding and the first congress of the party. Son Ngoc Minh was appointed as acting Chairman of the party. The party congress did not elect a full Central Committee, but instead appointed a Party Propagation and Formation Committee.

At the time of its formation, the Cambodian party was called the Kampuchean People's Revolutionary Party (KPRP). The ICP had been heavily dominated by Vietnamese and the KPRP was actively supported by the Vietnamese party during its initial phase of existence. Due to the reliance on Vietnamese support in the joint struggle against French colonial rule, the history of the party would later be rewritten, stating 1960 as the year of foundation of the party.

According to Democratic Kampuchea's version of party history, the Viet Minh's failure to negotiate a political role for the KPRP at the 1954 Geneva Conference represented a betrayal of the Cambodian movement, which still controlled large areas of the countryside and which commanded at least 5,000 armed men. Following the conference, about 1,000 members of the KPRP, including Son Ngoc Minh, made a Long March into North Vietnam, where they remained in exile. In late 1954, those who stayed in Cambodia founded a legal political party, the Krom Pracheachon, which participated in the 1955 and the 1958 National Assembly elections.

In the September 1955 election, it won about 4% of the vote, but did not secure a seat in the legislature. Members of the Pracheachon were subject to constant harassment and to arrests because the party remained outside Prince Norodom Sihanouk's Sangkum. Government attacks prevented it from participating in the 1962 election and drove it underground. It is speculated that the decision of Pracheachon to file candidates for the election had not been approved by the now renamed "Workers' Party of Kampuchea" (WPK). Sihanouk habitually labeled local leftists the Khmer Rouge, a term that later came to signify the party and the state.

During the mid-1950s, two KPRP factions, the "urban committee" (headed by Tou Samouth) and the "rural committee" (headed by Sieu Heng), emerged. In very general terms, these groups espoused divergent revolutionary lines. The prevalent "urban" line endorsed by North Vietnam recognized that Sihanouk by virtue of his success in winning independence from the French was a genuine national leader whose neutralism and deep distrust of the United States made him a valuable asset in Hanoi's struggle to "liberate" South Vietnam. Champions of this line hoped that the prince could be persuaded to distance himself from the right-wing and to adopt leftist policies.

The other line, supported for the most part by rural cadres who were familiar with the harsh realities of the countryside, advocated an immediate struggle to overthrow the "feudalist" Sihanouk. In 1959, Sieu Heng defected to the government and provided the security forces with information that enabled them to destroy as much as 90% of the party's rural apparatus. Although communist networks in Phnom Penh and in other towns under Tou Samouth's jurisdiction fared better, only a few hundred communists remained active in the country by 1960.

Paris students' group 
During the 1950s, Khmer students in Paris organized their own communist movement which had little, if any, connection to the hard-pressed party in their homeland. From their ranks came the men and women who returned home and took command of the party apparatus during the 1960s, led an effective insurgency against Sihanouk and Lon Nol from 1968 until 1975 and established the regime of Democratic Kampuchea.

Pol Pot, who rose to the leadership of the communist movement in the 1960s, was born in 1928 (some sources say in 1925) in Kampong Thum Province, northeast of Phnom Penh. He attended a technical high school in the capital and then went to Paris in 1949 to study radio electronics (other sources say he attended a school for printers and typesetters and also studied civil engineering). Ieng Sary was a Chinese-Khmer born in 1930 in South Vietnam, he attended the elite Lycée Sisowath in Phnom Penh before beginning courses in commerce and politics at the Paris Institute of Political Studies (more widely known as Sciences Po) in France. Khieu Samphan, considered "one of the most brilliant intellects of his generation", was born in 1931 and specialized in economics and politics during his time in Paris. In talent, he was rivaled by Hou Yuon (born in 1930), who studied economics and law. Son Sen (born in 1930) studied education and literature while Hu Nim (born in 1932) studied law.

Most members of the Paris student group came from landowner or civil servant families. Three of the Paris group forged a bond that survived years of revolutionary struggle and intraparty strife, Pol Pot and Ieng Sary married Khieu Ponnary and Khieu Thirith (also known as Ieng Thirith), purportedly relatives of Khieu Samphan. These two well-educated women also played a central role in the regime of Democratic Kampuchea.

At some time between 1949 and 1951, Pol Pot and Ieng Sary joined the French Communist Party. In 1951, the two men went to East Berlin to participate in a youth festival. This experience is considered to have been a turning point in their ideological development. Meeting with Khmers who were fighting with the Viet Minh (and whom they subsequently judged to be too subservient to the Vietnamese), they became convinced that only a tightly disciplined party organization and a readiness for armed struggle could achieve revolution. They transformed the Khmer Students' Association (KSA), to which most of the 200 or so Khmer students in Paris belonged, into an organization for nationalist and leftist ideas.

Inside the KSA and its successor organizations was a secret organization known as the Cercle Marxiste. The organization was composed of cells of three to six members with most members knowing nothing about the overall structure of the organization. In 1952, Pol Pot, Hou Yuon, Ieng Sary and other leftists gained notoriety by sending an open letter to Sihanouk calling him the "strangler of infant democracy". A year later, the French authorities closed down the KSA, but Hou Yuon and Khieu Samphan helped to establish in 1956 a new group, the Khmer Students' Union. Inside, the group was still run by the Cercle Marxiste.

The doctoral dissertations written by Hou Yuon and Khieu Samphan express basic themes that were later to become the cornerstones of the policy adopted by Democratic Kampuchea. The central role of the peasants in national development was espoused by Hou Yuon in his 1955 thesis, The Cambodian Peasants and Their Prospects for Modernization which challenged the conventional view that urbanization and industrialization are necessary precursors of development. The major argument in Khieu Samphan's 1959 thesis, Cambodia's Economy and Industrial Development, was that the country had to become self-reliant and end its economic dependency on the developed world. In its general contours, Khieu's work reflected the influence of a branch of the "dependency theory" school, which blamed lack of development in the Third World on the economic domination of the industrialized nations.

Clandestine existence in Phnom Penh 
After returning to Cambodia in 1953, Pol Pot threw himself into party work. At first, he went to join with forces allied to the Viet Minh operating in the rural areas of Kampong Cham Province (Kompong Cham). After the end of the war, he moved to Phnom Penh under Tou Samouth's "urban committee", where he became an important point of contact between above-ground parties of the left and the underground secret communist movement. His allies Ieng Sary and Hou Yuon became teachers at a new private high school, the Lycée Kambuboth, which Hou Yuon helped to establish.

Khieu Samphan returned from Paris in 1959, taught as a member of the law faculty of the University of Phnom Penh and started a left-wing French-language publication, L'Observateur. The paper soon acquired a reputation in Phnom Penh's small academic circle. The following year, the government closed the paper and Sihanouk's police publicly humiliated Khieu by beating, undressing and photographing him in public—as Shawcross notes, "not the sort of humiliation that men forgive or forget". Yet the experience did not prevent Khieu from advocating cooperation with Sihanouk in order to promote a united front against United States activities in South Vietnam. As mentioned, Khieu Samphan, Hou Yuon and Hu Nim were forced to "work through the system" by joining the Sangkum and by accepting posts in the prince's government.

From 28–30 September 1960, twenty-one leaders of the KPRP held a secret congress in a vacant room of the Phnom Penh railroad station. It is estimated that 14 delegates represented the 'rural' faction and seven the 'urban' faction. This pivotal event remains shrouded in mystery because its outcome has become an object of contention (and considerable historical rewriting) between pro-Vietnamese and anti-Vietnamese Khmer communist factions. At the meeting, the party was renamed as the Workers Party of Kampuchea. The question of cooperation with, or resistance to, Sihanouk was thoroughly discussed. A new party structure was adopted and for the first time a permanent Central Committee was appointed with Tou Samouth (who advocated a policy of cooperation) as the general secretary of the party.

His ally Nuon Chea, also known as Long Reth, became deputy general secretary while Pol Pot and Ieng Sary were named to the Central Committee to occupy the third and the fifth highest positions in the party hierarchy. Another committee member was veteran communist Keo Meas. In Democratic Kampuchea, this meeting would later be projected as the founding date of the party, consciously downplaying the history of the party prior to Pol Pot's ascent to leadership.

On 20 July 1962, Tou Samouth was murdered by the Cambodian government. At the WPK's second congress in February 1963, Pol Pot was chosen to succeed Tou Samouth as the party's general secretary. Tou's allies Nuon Chea and Keo Meas were removed from the Central Committee and replaced by Son Sen and Vorn Vet. From then on, Pol Pot and loyal allies from his Paris student days controlled the party center, edging out older veterans whom they considered excessively pro-Vietnamese.

Insurgency in rural Cambodia 
In July 1963, Pol Pot and most of the central committee left Phnom Penh to establish an insurgent base in Ratanakiri Province in the northeast. Pol Pot had shortly before been put on a list of thirty-four leftists who were summoned by Sihanouk to join the government and sign statements saying Sihanouk was the only possible leader for the country. Pol Pot and Chou Chet were the only people on the list who escaped. All the others agreed to cooperate with the government and were afterward under 24-hour watch by the police.

In the mid-1960s, the United States Department of State estimated the party membership to be approximately 100.

The region Pol Pot and the others moved to was inhabited by tribal minorities, the Khmer Loeu, whose rough treatment (including resettlement and forced assimilation) at the hands of the central government made them willing recruits for a guerrilla struggle. In 1965, Pol Pot made a visit of several months to North Vietnam and China. He probably received some training in China, which must have enhanced his prestige when he returned to the WPK's liberated areas. Despite friendly relations between Sihanouk and the Chinese, the latter kept Pol Pot's visit a secret from Sihanouk.

In 1971, the party changed its name to the Communist Party of Kampuchea (CPK). The party statutes, published in mid-1970s, claims that the name change was approved by the party congress in 1971. The change in the name of the party was a closely guarded secret. Lower ranking members of the party and even the Vietnamese were not told of it and neither was the membership until many years later.  The party leadership endorsed armed struggle against the government, then led by Sihanouk. In 1967, several small-scale attempts at insurgency were made by the CPK but they met with little success.

In 1968, the Khmer Rouge launched a national insurgency across Cambodia. Though North Vietnam had not been informed of the decision, its forces provided shelter and weapons to the Khmer Rouge after the insurgency started. The guerrilla forces of the party were baptized as the Kampuchean Revolutionary Army. Vietnamese support for the insurgency made it impossible for the ineffective and poorly motivated Royal Cambodian Army to effectively counter it.

Rise to power 
The political appeal of the Khmer Rouge was increased as a result of the situation created by the removal of Sihanouk as head of state in 1970. Premier Lon Nol, with the support of the National Assembly, deposed Sihanouk. Sihanouk, in exile in Beijing, made an alliance with the Kampuchean Communist Party and became the nominal head of a Khmer Rouge-dominated government-in-exile (known by its French acronym GRUNK) backed by the People's Republic of China. Sihanouk's popular support in rural Cambodia allowed the Khmer Rouge to extend its power and influence to the point that by 1973 it exercised de facto control over the majority of Cambodian territory, although only a minority of its population.

The relationship between the massive carpet bombing of Cambodia by the United States and the growth of the Khmer Rouge, in terms of recruitment and popular support, has been a matter of interest to historians. Some historians, including Michael Ignatieff, Adam Jones and Greg Grandin, have cited the United States intervention and bombing campaign (spanning 1965–1973) as a significant factor which led to increased support for the Khmer Rouge among the Cambodian peasantry. According to Ben Kiernan, the Khmer Rouge "would not have won power without U.S. economic and military destabilization of Cambodia. ... It used the bombing's devastation and massacre of civilians as recruitment propaganda and as an excuse for its brutal, radical policies and its purge of moderate communists and Sihanoukists."

Pol Pot biographer David P. Chandler writes that the bombing "had the effect the Americans wanted – it broke the Communist encirclement of Phnom Penh", but it also accelerated the collapse of rural society and increased social polarization. Peter Rodman and Michael Lind claimed that the United States intervention saved the Lon Nol regime from collapse in 1970 and 1973. Craig Etcheson acknowledged that U.S. intervention increased recruitment for the Khmer Rouge but disputed that it was a primary cause of the Khmer Rouge victory. William Shawcross wrote that the United States bombing and ground incursion plunged Cambodia into the chaos that Sihanouk had worked for years to avoid.

By 1973, Vietnamese support of the Khmer Rouge had largely disappeared. China "armed and trained" the Khmer Rouge both during the civil war and the years afterward.

When the United States Congress suspended military aid to the Lon Nol government in 1973, the Khmer Rouge made sweeping gains in the country, completely overwhelming the Khmer National Armed Forces. On 17 April 1975, the Khmer Rouge captured Phnom Penh and overthrew the Khmer Republic, executing all its officers.

Khmer Rouge in power 

The leadership of the Khmer Rouge was largely unchanged between the 1960s and the mid-1990s. The Khmer Rouge leaders were mostly from middle-class families and had been educated at French universities.

The Standing Committee of the Khmer Rouge's Central Committee (Party Center) during its period of power consisted of the following:
 Brother number 1 Pol Pot (Saloth Sar) — General Secretary of the Communist Party of Kampuchea, 1963–1981; Prime Minister of Democratic Kampuchea, 1976–1979
 Brother number 2 Nuon Chea (Long Bunruot) — Deputy General Secretary of the Communist Party, President of the Kampuchean People's Representative Assembly
 Brother number 3 Ieng Sary — Deputy Prime Minister of Democratic Kampuchea; Minister of Foreign Affairs, 1975–1979
 Brother number 4 Khieu Samphan — President of the State Presidium (head of state) of Democratic Kampuchea
 Brother number 5 Ta Mok (Chhit Chhoeun) — Leader of the National Army of Democratic Kampuchea; last Khmer Rouge leader, Southwest Regional Secretary
 Brother number 8 Ke Pauk — Regional Secretary of the Northern Zone
 Son Sen — Deputy Prime Minister of Democratic Kampuchea, Minister of Defense
 Yun Yat — Minister of Education, 1975–1977; Minister of Information (replaced Hu Nim in 1977)

In power, the Khmer Rouge carried out a radical program that included isolating the country from foreign influence, closing schools, hospitals and factories, abolishing banking, finance and currency, outlawing all religions, confiscating all private property and relocating people from urban areas to collective farms where forced labor was widespread. The purpose of this policy was to reform professional and urban Cambodians, or "New People" through agricultural labor under the supervision of the untainted rural "Old People". The goal was develop an economy based on the export of rice in order to later develop industry. The party adopted the slogan: "If we have rice, we can have everything". These actions and policies resulted in massive deaths through executions, work exhaustion, illness and starvation.

In Phnom Penh and other cities, the Khmer Rouge told residents that they would be moved only about "two or three kilometers" outside the city and would return in "two or three days". Some witnesses say they were told that the evacuation was because of the "threat of American bombing" and that they did not have to lock their houses since the Khmer Rouge would "take care of everything" until they returned. These were not the first evacuations of civilian populations by the Khmer Rouge. Similar evacuations of populations without possessions had been occurring on a smaller scale since the early 1970s.

The Khmer Rouge attempted to turn Cambodia into a classless society by depopulating cities and forcing the urban population into agricultural communes through brutal totalitarian methods. The entire population was forced to become farmers in labour camps. During their four years in power, the Khmer Rouge overworked and starved the population while at the same time executing selected groups who had the potential to undermine the new state (including intellectuals) and killing many others for even minor breaches of rules.

Through the 1970s and especially after mid-1975, the party became increasingly paranoid, blaming failures caused by its agricultural policies on external enemies (usually the CIA and Vietnam) and domestic traitors. The resultant purges reached a crest in 1977 and 1978 when thousands, including some important CPK leaders, were executed. The older generation of CPK members, suspected of having links with or sympathies for Vietnam, were targeted by the Pol Pot leadership.

Angkar  

For roughly two years after the CPK took power, it referred to itself as the Angkar (meaning 'The Organization'). However, Pol Pot publicly declared on 29 September 1977 the existence of the CPK in a five-hour-long speech. He revealed the true character of the supreme authority in Cambodia, an obscure ruling body that had been kept in seclusion.

The CPK had been extremely secretive throughout its existence. Before 1975, the secrecy was needed for the party's survival and Pol Pot and his closest associates had relied on continuing the extreme secrecy in order to consolidate their position against those they perceived as internal enemies during their first two years of power. The revelation of the CPK's existence shortly before Pol Pot was due to travel to Peking resulted from pressure from China on the Khmer Rouge leaders to acknowledge their true political identity at a time that they increasingly depended on China's assistance against the threats from Vietnam.

Accordingly, Pol Pot in his speech claimed that the CPK's foundation had been in 1960 and emphasized its separate identity from the Communist Party of Vietnam.  This secrecy continued even after the CPK took power. Unlike most totalitarian dictators, Pol Pot was not the object of an open personality cult. It was almost a year before it was confirmed that he was Saloth Sar, the man long cited as the CPK's general secretary.

Fall of the Khmer Rouge 

Because of several years of border conflict and the flood of refugees fleeing Cambodia, relations between Cambodia and Vietnam deteriorated by December 1978. Fearing a Vietnamese attack, Pol Pot ordered a pre-emptive invasion of Vietnam on 18 April 1978. His Cambodian forces crossed the border and looted nearby villages. Despite Chinese aid, these Cambodian forces were repulsed by the Vietnamese.

In early 1979, a pro-Vietnamese group of CPK dissidents led by Pen Sovan held a congress (which they saw as the third party congress, therefore not recognizing the 1963, 1975 and 1978 party congresses as legitimate) near the Vietnamese border. Along with Heng Samrin, Pen Sovan was one of the foremost founding members of the Kampuchean United Front for National Salvation (KUFNS or FUNSK), after becoming disillusioned with the Khmer Rouge. Effectively, the CPK was then divided into two, with the Pen Sovan-led group constituting a separate party, the Kampuchean People's Revolutionary Party (now the Cambodian People's Party).

The Vietnamese forces invaded Cambodia along with the KUFNS, capturing Phnom Penh on 7 January 1979. The Pen Sovan-led party was installed as the governing party of the new People's Republic of Kampuchea. The CPK led by Pol Pot withdrew its forces westwards to an area near the Thai border. With unofficial protection from elements of the Thai Army, it began guerrilla warfare against the PRK government.

The party founded the Patriotic and Democratic Front of the Great National Union of Kampuchea as a united front in September 1979 to fight the PRK and the Vietnamese. The front was led by Khieu Samphan. In December 1979, the armed forces under the command of the party, what remained of the erstwhile People's National Liberation Armed Forces of Kampuchea, were renamed National Army of Democratic Kampuchea. In 1981, the party was dissolved and substituted by the Party of Democratic Kampuchea.

See also 

 Agrarian socialism
 Communist Youth League of Kampuchea
 Party of Democratic Kampuchea

Notes

References

External links 
 List of incidents attributed to the Khmer Rouge on the START database

1951 establishments in Cambodia
Anti-Vietnamese sentiment
Communist parties in Cambodia
Defunct political parties in Cambodia
Democratic Kampuchea
Formerly ruling communist parties
Khmer Rouge
Nationalist parties in Cambodia
Organizations of the Vietnam War
Parties of one-party systems
Political parties established in 1951
Republicanism in Cambodia
Rebel groups in Cambodia